Snakedrill is an EP by English rock band Wire, released in November 1986 by Mute Records. It was the first release after the band's five-year hiatus (1980–1985), and foreshadows their extensive use of electronic instrumentation on following albums, particularly on "A Serious of Snakes", which contains multiple layered synth and keyboard parts.

The entire EP is now included in the form of bonus tracks on The Ideal Copy (1987).

Content 
"A Serious of Snakes" and "Advantage in Height" are slightly mainstream, avant-pop tracks, while the droning "Drill", which is based around a single chord, is described by Paul Lester in the book Lowdown: The Story of Wire as "far removed from the luscious musicality" of earlier songs like "Outdoor Miner" and "Map Ref. 41°N 93°W". Instead, "the delight," he wrote, "lay in the sonic layers and textures rather than any melodic twists and turns." The almost a cappella "Up to the Sun," sung as a duet by Graham Lewis and Colin Newman, is likened to a Gregorian chant by Lester. The track is described by AllMusic as a "pseudo-mystical incantation" and was allegedly written by Lewis in order to "cure" Newman, who had been suffering from hepatitis.

Track listing 
All tracks are written by Wire
"'A Serious of Snakes...'" – 4:53
"Drill" – 5:05
"Advantage in Height" – 3:05
"Up to the Sun" – 2:50

Personnel 
Adapted from the EP liner notes, except where noted.

Wire
B.C. Gilbert
Colin Newman
Graham Lewis
Robert Gotobed
Technical personnel
Daniel Miller – producer, mixing
Gareth Jones – producer, engineer, mixing
David Buckland – cover photography

References

External links 

 

1986 debut EPs
Wire (band) EPs
Mute Records EPs
Albums produced by Daniel Miller (music producer)
Albums produced by Gareth Jones (music producer)